is a Japanese manga series written and illustrated by Taiyō Matsumoto. It was serialized in Shogakukan's Big Comic Original magazine from June 2016 to July 2017.

Publication
Cats of the Louvre is written and illustrated by Taiyō Matsumoto. It was serialized in Shogakukan's Big Comic Original manga magazine from June 20, 2016 to July 20, 2017. Shogakukan published its individual chapters into two wideban volumes, released on October 30, 2017.

In North America, the manga has been licensed by Viz Media. It was released in a single volume on September 17, 2019.

Reception
Along with Kamome Shirahama's Witch Hat Atelier, the series won the 2020 Eisner Award for Best U.S. Edition of International Material in the Asia category for Viz Media's English release.

Rebecca Silverman of Anime News Network gave the series 4 out of 5 stars. Silverman wrote: "It's an interesting piece, as much a work of art criticism and engagement as it is a story. Matsumoto's art style manages to add to the air of magic realism about the piece, and this would be a really interesting work to incorporate into an art appreciate or art history class, or to read while you're taking one". Faye Hopper of the same website gave it 4½ out of 5 stars. Hopper said "Cats of the Louvre is a beautiful, moving, and artistically rich story about escapism, and the value therein", adding "Like the paintings at the Louvre, it demands the most careful, loving consideration. If you too love art and can hear the paintings sing, you owe it to yourself to experience it". Theron Martin of the same website, ranked the series as a B+. Martin wrote: "While some stylistic quirks in this manga did not work for me, it's a distinct departure from the norm that readers won't have to be a fan of either classical art or cats in order to appreciate".

References

External links
 

Art in anime and manga
Comics about cats
Comics set in Paris
Eisner Award winners
Fantasy anime and manga
Louvre
Mystery anime and manga
Seinen manga
Shogakukan manga
Taiyō Matsumoto
Viz Media manga